George Herbert Marshall (born 2 October 1876, date of death unknown) was a British track and field athlete. Marshall was the son of British doctor living in Greece. He competed at the 1896 Summer Olympics in Athens. He was listed as being affiliated with "London" or "Oxford" in the programme for the athletics events, but as a member of the Panathinaikos Club of Patras for tennis. He was born in Patras, Greece.

Marshall ran in the 100 metres, finishing last of five runners in his preliminary heat and not advancing to the final. He also competed in the 800 metres, again finishing in last place of the four runners in his preliminary heat. He was entered in, but did not compete in, the men's singles and men's doubles (with Frank Marshall) tennis events.

References

External links

1876 births
Year of death missing
Place of death missing
Athletes from Patras
British male middle-distance runners
British male sprinters
Olympic athletes of Great Britain
Athletes (track and field) at the 1896 Summer Olympics
19th-century sportsmen